Babe, I Love You is a 2010 Filipino romantic comedy film directed by Mae Cruz-Alviar and starring Anne Curtis and Sam Milby. It was produced by Viva Films and ABS-CBN Film Productions.

Plot
In the academe, Nicolas “Nico” Veneracion Borromeo is a highly esteemed History of Architecture professor who is on his way to becoming the next Vice Dean of the Department. He knows that achieving this would finally make his mother proud of him and forgive him for indirectly causing his father’s death.

And yet, when he meets an unconventional girl named Sandra “Sasa” Sanchez, his world turns upside down. He never thought that he could fall in love with someone who works as a promo-girl and is obviously unacceptable in his life.

Cast
Anne Curtis as Sandra "Sasa" Sanchez
Sam Milby as Nicolas "Nico" Veneracion Borromeo
Megan Young as Gaita Veneracion Borromeo
AJ Perez † as Gian Veneracion Borromeo
Guji Lorenzana as Jet
Kitkat as Agnes
Nikki Valdez as Chrissy
Thou Reyes as BemBem
Nikki Bacolod as KengKeng
Angel Sy as TamTam
CJ Jaravata as Tere
Nicole Uysiuseng as Chloe
Cheska Ortega as Ms. Wiez
Niña Dolino as Monique
Ricardo Cepeda as Bobby
Shamaine Buencamino as Margarita
Tetchie Agbayani as Lala Sanchez
Leo Rialp as Dean Kintanar
Laurice Guillen as Isabel Veneracion-Borromeo
Roden Araneta † as Ibarra Gonzales

Production
Film production started in 2009. The first teaser was released through Star Cinema's official YouTube account. The teaser was also shown in the theaters with I'll Be There. On March 11, 2010, a music video of the film was released again on Star Cinema's official YouTube account. It showed the singer of the theme song, Piolo Pascual and some scenes from the film.

Reception

International screenings
Babe, I Love You was shown in select United States cities such as San Francisco, Cerritos, California, San Diego, Los Angeles, Las Vegas, Seattle, Chicago, Bergenfield, Honolulu  and Guam. It also had screenings in Ontario, Abu Dhabi, Doha and Dubai.

Box office
This film was released on April 3, 2010 and it grossed ₱12 million pesos in its first day. As of May 2, 2010, the film grossed ₱96.34M, overtaking the Columbia Pictures with Maid in Manhattan, according to Box Office Mojo.

References

External links 
 
 

2010 films
2010s Tagalog-language films
2010s English-language films
Star Cinema films
Viva Films films
Philippine romance films
2010 romance films
2010 multilingual films
Philippine multilingual films
Films directed by Mae Cruz-Alviar